China Railway Ürümqi Group, officially abbreviated as CR Ürümqi or CR-Ürümqi, also known as CR Xinjiang, formerly, Ürümqi Railway Administration is a subsidiaries company under the jurisdiction of the China Railway (formerly the Ministry of Railway). It supervises the railway network within Xinjiang and Western Gansu. The railway administration was reorganized as a company in November 2017.

Hub stations
 Ürümqi
 Korgas
 
 Alashankou

References

Rail transport in Xinjiang
China Railway Corporation